Burcu Dağ (born June 28, 1981) is a Turkish female para-archer competing in the women's Compound bow Standing event.

She began with archery in 2011. She shoots right-handed.

Dağ won a gold medal in the individual and another gold medal in the team event at the 2013 World Para-archery Championships held in Bangkok, Thailand.

In 2014, she won a bronze medal with her teammates Gülbin Su and Handan Biroğlu, and a gold medal in the mixed team event at the European Para-Archery Championships in Nottwil, Switzerland.

References

1981 births
Place of birth missing (living people)
Turkish female archers
Paralympic archers of Turkey
Living people
20th-century Turkish sportswomen
21st-century Turkish sportswomen